The 2009–10 Tennessee Volunteers basketball team represented the University of Tennessee in the 2009-10 NCAA Division I men's basketball season. This was the fifth season for Bruce Pearl as the Volunteers' head coach. The team, a member of the Eastern Division of the Southeastern Conference, played its home games at Thompson-Boling Arena. They finished the season 28–9, 11–5 in SEC play and advanced to the semifinals of the 2010 SEC men's basketball tournament before losing to Kentucky. They received an at-large bid to the 2010 NCAA Division I men's basketball tournament, earning a 6 seed in the Midwest Region. They defeated 11 seed San Diego State in the first round and 14 seed Ohio to advance to the Sweet Sixteen. In the regional semifinal they defeated 2 seed and AP #5 Ohio State to advance to the first Elite Eight in school history. They were defeated by 5 seed and AP #13 Michigan State in the regional final to end their season.

Preseason
The 2008–09 Volunteers finished the season 21–13 overall, against the second-rated schedule in the nation, with a 10–6 mark in conference play. The Vols won the SEC East crown and appeared in the SEC Championship Game for the first time since 1991. In postseason play, the Volunteers earned a number 9 seed in the NCAA tournament. The team went on to lose in the first round to the Oklahoma State Cowboys and finished the season unranked.

The Vols lost several players during the off-season. Two seniors from the team graduated: Tanner Wild and Ryan Childress. Philip Jurick did not return to the team and Daniel West did not have his scholarship extended due to being academically ineligible. Also, sophomore forward Emmanuel Negedu underwent surgery and will not play for the 2009–10 season. Negedu had to have a sub-pectoral implantable cardiac defibrillator implanted after suffering a cardiac arrest after a workout in the Neyland-Thompson Sports Complex on September 28, 2009. On October 28, 2009, senior guard Josh Tabb, who was indefinitely suspended on September 18, returned to Illinois in order to care after his ailing mother.

On November 2, 2009, the SEC released the rosters for the All-SEC first and second teams. Senior guard/forward Tyler Smith was chosen for the first team All-SEC. Wayne Chism was selected for the second team All-SEC.

On January 1, 2010, Tyler Smith, Cameron Tatum, Brian Williams, and Melvin Goins were arrested for weapons charges and marijuana possession. Coach Bruce Pearl suspended the four players. Tyler Smith was dismissed from the team, and the three other players have since been reinstated.

Class of 2009 Signees

2009–10 Roster

2009–10 Schedule

|-
!colspan=9| Exhibition

|-
!colspan=9| Regular season

|-
!colspan=9| 2010 SEC tournament

|-

|-

|-
!colspan=9| 2010 NCAA tournament

|-

|-

|-

See also
 2009–10 Tennessee Lady Volunteers basketball team

References

Tennessee
Tennessee Volunteers basketball seasons
Tennessee
Volunteers
Volunteers